The 2020 Spanish Grand Prix (officially known as the Formula 1 Aramco Gran Premio de España 2020) was a Formula One motor race held on 16 August 2020 at the Circuit de Barcelona-Catalunya in Montmeló, Spain. The race was the sixth round in the 2020 Formula One World Championship, and took place one week after the previous round, the 70th Anniversary Grand Prix.

Background

Impact of the COVID-19 pandemic

The opening rounds of the  championship were heavily affected by the COVID-19 pandemic. Several Grands Prix were cancelled or postponed after the planned opening round in Australia was called off two days before the race was due to take place; prompting the FIA to draft a new calendar. The Spanish Grand Prix was originally intended to be held on 10 May.

Championship standings before the race
Mercedes driver Lewis Hamilton led the Drivers' Championship by 30 points from Red Bull-Honda driver Max Verstappen. Four points behind Verstappen was Hamilton's teammate Valtteri Bottas. In the Constructors' Championship, Mercedes led by 67 points from Red Bull Racing. In third place was Ferrari, who were 58 points behind Red Bull and 2 points ahead of fourth-placed McLaren.

Entrants

The drivers and teams were the same as those on the season entry list with no additional stand-in drivers for the race. Roy Nissany took part in the first practice session for Williams in place of George Russell.

Tyres

The C1, C2 and C3 tyre compounds were made available for teams to use by Pirelli, the hardest three tyre compounds available. These were the same compounds used at the 2019 event.

Free practice 
Bottas topped the first practice session ahead of teammate Hamilton. Hamilton went on to top the other two sessions, while Esteban Ocon (driving for the Renault team) spun into the wall during the final session while attempting to avoid a collision with the Haas of Kevin Magnussen.

Qualifying

Qualifying report
Hamilton claimed his 92nd pole position in Formula One, beating Bottas, his teammate, by a less than a tenth of a second. It was the eighth consecutive year that a Mercedes driver had taken pole for the Spanish Grand Prix. Bottas said that Hamilton's speed advantage came in the final part of the lap. Verstappen was third ahead of the two Racing Points of Sergio Pérez and Lance Stroll. Alex Albon qualified in sixth, over seven-tenths of a second behind teammate Verstappen. McLaren teammates Carlos Sainz Jr and Lando Norris qualified in seventh and eighth while Charles Leclerc qualified ninth for Ferrari with a time less than a tenth of a second slower than Albon's time. Scuderia AlphaTauri driver Pierre Gasly qualified tenth after he could not match the pace he had had in the second part of qualifying during the top ten shootout. Ferrari's Sebastian Vettel and AlphaTauri's Daniil Kvyat were slower than their teammates and failed to make it out of the second segment. Vettel qualified eleventh and Kvyat twelfth. The Renault cars had looked fast in practice but Daniel Ricciardo could only manage thirteenth place while Ocon was fifteenth. Lap times were slower than those in qualifying for the 2019 Spanish Grand Prix because of the hot August weather.

Qualifying classification

Race

Race report 
After starting in second, Bottas was overtaken by Verstappen and Stroll at the first corner. Bottas then used the drag reduction system on the fifth lap to pass Stroll and move back up into third place. Hamilton won the race by 24 seconds, lapping everyone except for Verstappen and Bottas, who completed the podium in second and third place. Ferrari driver Charles Leclerc retired from the race with a mechanical problem after he spun at the chicane. Leclerc's teammate Sebastian Vettel finished seventh after driving for more than half the race distance on one set of soft tyres.

Race classification 

Notes
  – Includes one point for fastest lap.
  – Sergio Pérez finished fourth on the track, but received a five-second time penalty for ignoring blue flags.
  – Daniil Kvyat received a five-second time penalty for ignoring blue flags.

Championship standings after the race

Drivers' Championship standings

Constructors' Championship standings

 Note: Only the top five positions are included for both sets of standings.

See also 
 2020 Barcelona Formula 2 round
 2020 Barcelona Formula 3 round

Notes

References

External links 

Spanish
Spanish Grand Prix
Spanish Grand Prix
Spanish Grand Prix
Spanish Grand Prix